Enrico Martini (nom de guerre "Mauri") Mondovì, 29 January 1911 – Turkey, 19 September 1976) was an Italian soldier and partisan, an Alpini Major, founder of the 1 Group Alpine Divisions in the Italian Resistance, and a recipient of the Gold Medal of Military Valor.

Biography 
Upon leaving Liceo Classico, Martini entered the Modena Military Academy in 1929; after graduation he was assigned to the Alpini Corps where he started his officer career. In 1936 he participated in the Second Italo-Abyssinian War with 7th Reggimento Alpini of 5 Alpine Division Pusteria; during this campaign he received the Croce di Guerra for the gallantry demonstrated in the battle of Lake Ashenge.
In April 1941 he was sent to North Africa where he remained until Spring 1943, taking part to the battles in Marmarica and in the Egyptian desert. He received three more awards for military valor and advanced to the rank of Maggiore (Major).

Resistance leader
Repatriated in the Spring of 1943, he was assigned to the Regio Esercito General Staff, where he stayed up till 8 September 1943, on which date he took part to the battle of Rome, embedded in a Grenadier unit.

Later, he traveled back to Piedmont to join units belonging to the Italian Fourth Army, so as to carry on the anti-German resistance.

He was captured by the Germans and interned in the Apuania concentration camp, from which he managed to escape and he reached his native province of Cuneo on 17 September.

A supporter of the Italian monarchy, he set up the first network of units from the valleys around Cuneo, in the Langhe, in the Monferrato: in twenty months of unstinting and merciless fighting against Nazi and Fascist forces, he raised 1 Gruppo Divisioni Alpine (1 Group Alpine Divisions) within C.V.L. which, at the time of the final uprising of 25 April 1945 consisted of nine partisan Divisions roughly numbering ten thousand men each. He largely contributed to the liberation of Turin, Asti, Alessandria, Alba, Bra, Mondovì, Ceva, Savona, after paying a toll of nine-hundred dead and one thousand wounded or mutilated to the cause of freedom.

Up to the end of the war, 1 Gruppo Divisioni Alpine earned eleven medals on the field, of which 3 Medals of Military Valor.
The entire dossier of 1 Gruppo Divisioni Alpine is stored in the archive of the Piedmontese "Giorgio Agosti" Institute for the History of the Resistance and contemporary society.

Confrontation with the CLN
"Mauri" even had some trouble in being recognized as a commander by the Cuneo provincial branch of the National Liberation Committee which did not deem him sufficiently well-known. "Mauri"'s reply was sharp: "... In fact, in twenty months of war waged on two thirds of that province, I haven't had the pleasure to know that a local CLN existed. But I do not bother to know today either. |Mauri, Con la Libertà e per la libertà, pag. 9"

Postwar period
At the end of the war he became a member of the Consulta Nazionale (National Council) as a representative of the Formazioni Autonome (non-political partisan units), and a strenuous supporter of the award of the Gold Medal of Military Valor to the city of Alba by means of a letter sent to the Piedmontese military commission, whereas the Silver medal had been officially proposed.

In 1947 he requested and obtained the transfer to the military reserve, leaving active Army service with the rank of Tenente colonnello (Lieutenant Colonel).
He earned a degree in Law at the Università di Torino and became a company executive.

In 1971 he entered the Committees of Democratic Resistance, raised by fellow monarchist partisan Edgardo Sogno with "anti-communist" goals.

He died in a plane crash in Turkey on 19 September 1976.

Literature
Johnny the Partisan (Il partigiano Johnny) by Beppe Fenoglio

Bibliography
A. Spinardi, Mauri e i suoi, collana storica della Resistenza cuneese, Cassa di Rispramio di Cuneo, 1994
R. Amedeo, Alba libera, Fossano, 1980
Enrico Martini, Noi del 1º Gruppo Divisioni Alpine, Torino, 1945
Enrico Martini,Con la libertà e per la libertà, Società editrice torinese, Torino, 1947
Enrico martini,Partigiani penne nere: Boves Val Maudagna, Val Casotto, Le Langhe, Arnoldo Mondadori, Milano, 1968, 265pag
Di Domenico De Napoli, Antonio Ratti, Silvio Bolognini, La resistenza monarchica in Italia (1943–1945), Guida
 Piero Negri, Luca Bufano, Pierfrancesco Manca, Chicco De Luigi, Il partigiano Fenoglio: uno scrittore nella guerra civile, Fandango libri, 2000, 127pag

Honors and awards 
Gold Medal of Military Valor

Maggiore in servizio permanente effettivo (Major and career officer) in the Alpini Corps - Partisan

First promoter of the Resistance in the Monregalese, organizer of the early armed parties in Val Maudagna and Val Casotto, after proving to be a commander of great skill and legendary courage in the course of hard fighting, he gathered some thousands of well-armed and well-disciplined combatants, coordinating all partisan activity in the Langhe and lower Monferrato. In Summer and Autumn 1944 he occupied, in cooperation with other formations, the city of Alba, firmly in enemy hands, and there he resisted for more than a month. At the start of Winter he engaged in fierce fighting as many as two German Divisions sent in to take the area back and, after sustaining heavy losses and inflicting heavier, he managed to stay in arms in the area. In governing the civilian population in the provinces of Cuneo, Asti, Alessandria, and part of the province of Savona he showed preeminent maturity of judgement, organizational skill, balance, energy, brotherly and heartfelt interest, so much that he was remembered with favor even in the years to come. In early Spring 1945, with a well-arranged and gallantly led action, after harsh fighting he occupied with his own forces Alba, Canelli, Nizza Monferrato, Monesiglio and, during the general insurrection he also liberated Savona, Ceva, Mondovì, Fossano, Bra, Racconigi, Carmagnola, eventually reaching Turin with his group of Partisan divisions.

Southern Piedmont and Northwestern Liguria, September 1944 to 25 April 1945.

 Bronze Star

 Order of Merit of the Italian Republic

 War Cross for Military Valor

Cross of Merit (Poland)

Acknowledgements
On 12 November 1947 the city council of Alba, Piedmont conferred him the honorary citizenship.

"Maggiore Martini Enrico, a.k.a. commander "Mauri", organizer and chief of the Autonomous partisan formations in the Langhe, brought to the arduous and dangerous mission his spirit of initiative and indomitable courage. The city of Alba, which gave the partisan bands the blossom of its youth and had the venture to be liberated first from the nazi-fascist yoke of which it knew the ferocious reprisals, awards commander "Mauri" the Honorary Citizenship as a sign of praise, and in his name exalts the partisans from all formations and their Commanders who, stoically fighting in the Alba area from 1943 to 1945, were meritorious leaders in the cause of the Liberation.|Alba 12 November 1947"

Alba and Turin both dedicated a street to his name.

See also
Raffaele Cadorna Jr.
Republic of Alba (1944)
Garibaldi Brigades
Ettore Ruocco
Innocenzo Contini
Pietro Augusto Dacomo
Nicola Monaco
Piero Balbo

Notes

External links 
Federazione Italiani Volontari della Libertà
Fondo archivistico 1 Gruppo divisioni alpine presso Istoreto 
Bio of Enrico Martini
Giuseppe Fenoglio Association
Commander "Mauri" in the words of a man who was a child at the time and heard of Mauri's deeds in infancy from Memoro - la Banca della Memoria
Walking into History: paths of freedoms in the Monregale (Cuneo) valleys

Recipients of the Gold Medal of Military Valor
Italian soldiers
Italian resistance movement members
Italian military personnel of World War II
Recipients of the Cross of Merit (Poland)
Italian anti-communists
Italian monarchists
Victims of aviation accidents or incidents in Turkey
Recipients of the War Cross for Military Valor
People from Mondovì